Wanegaon is a village in Nanded taluka of Nanded district of the Indian state of Maharashtra. It is also a railway station on the Nanded-Aurangabad route.

Demography
As per 2011 census, Wanegaon has total 126 families residing. Village has population of 644 of which 336 were males while 308 were females.
Average Sex Ratio of village is 917 which is lower than Maharashtra state average of 929.
Literacy rate of village was 72% compared to 82.95% of Maharashtra. Male literacy rate was 88% while female literacy rate was 55%.
Scheduled Caste people constitutes 21% of total population.

Wanegaon Railway Station

Geography and Transport
Following table shows distance of Wanegaon from some of major cities.

References

Villages in Nanded district